Glendale Springs is an unincorporated community in Ashe County, North Carolina, United States. Glendale Springs has a post office with ZIP code 28629.

The Glendale Springs Inn was listed on the National Register of Historic Places in 1979.

Media reference

In the 1990 movie hit, Days of Thunder, Cole Trickle (Tom Cruise) is first mistaken as being from Glendale Springs when Tim Daland (Randy Quaid) corrects the mistake and clarifies he is instead from Glendale, California.

References

Unincorporated communities in Ashe County, North Carolina
Unincorporated communities in North Carolina
Spa towns in the United States